Parliamentary elections in the First Czechoslovak Republic were held in 1920, 1925, 1929 and 1935. The Czechoslovak National Assembly consisted of two chambers, the Chamber of Deputies and the Senate, both elected through universal suffrage. During the First Republic, many political parties struggled for political influence and only once did a single party muster a quarter of the national vote. Parties were generally set up along ethnic lines.

Electoral system
The electoral system of the First Republic was based on the Czechoslovak Constitution of 1920. Parliamentary elections were regulated by Acts 123 and 208 of 1920.

The Czechoslovak parliament at the time consisted of a Chamber of Deputies (300 members) and a Senate (150 members). Parliamentarians were elected under a proportional representation system using multi-member electoral districts. The Hare quota was used in the first count, and the Hagenbach-Bischoff quota in the second count. The President of the Republic was elected by both houses of parliament.

Suffrage was universal, secret and compulsory for all citizens aged 21 years and above for elections to the Chamber of Deputies and aged 26 years and above for the Senate. Voters were required to have lived in their respective constituency for three months to be entitled to vote there. Bankrupt citizens and citizens convicted of crimes could lose their right to vote.

Candidates to the Chamber of Deputies had to be 30 years of age and Czechoslovak citizens for at least three years. Candidates to the Senate had to be 45 years of age and Czechoslovak citizens for at least ten years.

The Ministry of the Interior was charged with organizing the elections.

Electoral districts
Initially, the republic had 23 electoral districts for elections to the Chamber of Deputies and 13 electoral districts for the Senate. Below is a table where the Chamber of Deputies electoral districts are organized by Senate electoral district, with 1921 and 1930 census data for reference. Constituency and seat numbers in parentheses refer to the situation before the 1925 re-districting.

Sources:

Party system
Only accredited parties could present candidates for election. With the proportional representation list vote system and ethno-linguistic pluralism, many different political parties flourished. Parties were divided along class, ethnic, religious and regional lines. After the formation of Czechoslovakia, new parties had begun to be formed in Slovakia whilst established Czech parties immediately expanded their activities to Slovak areas.

The greatest vote-share any single party ever managed in a national election was 25.7%, earned by the Czechoslovak Social Democratic Workers Party (ČSDSD) in the 1920 election, and no other party received as much as 16% in any elections of the First Republic. Thus coalition governments with the support of several parties became a necessity.

1920 election

Voting for the Chamber of Deputies occurred on April 18, 1920, and voting for the Senate was held a week later on April 25, 1920. 281 members of the Chamber of Deputies were elected, as no elections were held in the Hlučín Region (part of the Moravská Ostrava electoral district, resulting in 1 fewer deputy elected from that district), the Těšín electoral district (9 deputies) and the Užhorod electoral district (9 deputies). 23 parties contested the election; 16 won parliamentary representation. The ČSDSD emerged as the largest party in the 1920 election, with 25.7% of the vote for the Chamber of Deputies, 74 deputies elected, 28.1% of the vote for the Senate and 41 senators elected. There was also the German Social Democratic Workers Party in the Czechoslovak Republic (DSAP) with 11.1% of the Chamber of Deputies vote, 31 deputies and 16 senators, as well as the Hungarian-German Social Democratic Party with 1.8% of the Chamber of Deputies vote and 4 deputies. The Czechoslovak People's Party (ČSL) became the second largest party in the parliament with 11.3% of the Chamber of Deputies vote, 33 deputies, 11.9% of the Senate vote and 18 senators.

Among Czech voters, the 1920 election outcome was marked by remarkable stability compared to the 1911 election. The gap between Czech socialist and bourgeois parties had only moved by 0.4% compared to the 1911 result.

1924 election in Subcarpathian Rus'
Elections for representatives to the Czechoslovak parliament from Subcarpathian Rus' had been did not take place in 1920, as the area remained under a joint military-civilian administration. A by-election for deputies to the Czechoslovak parliament from the Užhorod electoral district (i.e. Subcarpathian Rus') was held on March 16, 1924. The Communist Party of Czechoslovakia (KSČ) emerged as the winner of the election.

1925 re-districting

Ahead of the 1925 parliamentary election, the 1920 electoral law was amended, resulting in the abolition of the Těšín electoral district (following the decision of the Conference of Ambassadors on the Polish-Czechoslovak border conflict). About half of the territory of the Těšín electoral district had been awarded to Poland by the decision of the Conference of Ambassadors July 28, 1920. The areas of the erstwhile Těšín district that remained in Czechoslovakia became part of the Moravská Ostrava electoral district.

The nine Chamber of Deputies seats that had been allocated to Těšín in 1920 were re-allocated to the Prague (3), Brno (1) and Moravská Ostrava (5) electoral districts. One of the Těšín Senate seats was allocated to Prague, the remaining three went to Moravská Ostrava.

Moreover, the Prague electoral district was divided into two subdistricts, I A and I B, which each would elect 24 members of the Chamber of Deputies.

No further changes in the distribution of seats of the Chamber of Deputies would take place ahead of the 1929 and 1935 elections.

1925 election
The 1925 Chamber of Deputies and Senate elections were held on November 15, 1925. 39 parties presented candidates, and 16 parties won seats. The Republican Party of Farmers and Peasants (RSZML) was the party with the most votes, with 13.7% of the Chamber of Deputies vote, 45 deputies, 13.8% of the Senate vote and 23 senators. With the Social Democracy divided, the Communist Party became the second largest party in parliament, with 13.2% of the Chamber of Deputies vote, 41 deputies and 20 senators. Hlinka's Slovak People's Party (HSĽS) emerged as a major force in Slovakia. With 34.3% of the votes from Slovakia, 23 deputies and 12 senators, the party was by far the largest in Slovakia.

Act 56 (1927)
Act 56 of 1927 disenfranchised members of the armed forces and the gendarmerie from voting in parliamentary elections.

1929 election
The 1929 parliamentary election was held on October 27, 1929. The RSZML retained its position as the largest party, with 15% of the Chamber of Deputies vote, followed by the ČSDSD with 13%. In Slovakia, HSĽS suffered a setback. It had renounced its government participation earlier the same month. The party obtained 28.3% of the votes in Slovakia: 19 deputies and 9 senators.

1935 election
The 1935 parliamentary election was held on May 19, 1935. The Sudeten German Party (SdP) became the largest party in parliament, with 15.2% of the Chamber of Deputies vote, 44 deputies and 23 senators.

References

Elections in Czechoslovakia